Eugenia Escudero Lavat (26 November 1914 – 18 January 2011) was a Mexican fencer. She competed in the women's individual foil event at the 1932 Summer Olympics. She married Hans Backhoff and had 5 children.  Escudero died on 18 January 2011, at the age of 96.

References

External links
 

1914 births
2011 deaths
Mexican female foil fencers
Olympic fencers of Mexico
Fencers at the 1932 Summer Olympics
Fencers from Mexico City